YHA may refer to:

 Port Hope Simpson Airport, Canada, IATA code YHA
 YHA Australia, a youth hostel association in Australia
 York Housing Association, a housing association in North Yorkshire
 Yorkshire Hockey Association, in England
 Young Hollywood Awards, entertainment awards voted by 13- to 19-year-olds.
 Young Heart Attack, a rock band
 Youth Hostels Association (England & Wales), a youth hostel charity in the United Kingdom
 Youth Hostel Association of New Zealand, a youth hostel association in New Zealand